Dehnow, Deh Now, Deh-e Now, Dehno, Deh Nau or Deh-i-Nau (Persian: , meaning "new village") may refer to:

Afghanistan
Deh Naw, a neighborhood in western Kabul.
Shahr-i Now , is a town in Khwahan District Badakhshan province is located.
Deh Now, Afghanistan, a village in Balkh Province.
Deh-e Now, former name of Shirin Tagab District, Afghanistan

Iran

Bushehr Province
Deh Now, Dashtestan, a village in Dashtestan County
Dehnow, Kangan, a village in Kangan County
Deh-e Now, Tangestan, a village in Tangestan County
Dehnow, Delvar, a village in Tangestan County

Chaharmahal and Bakhtiari Province
Dehnow, Ardal, a village in Ardal County
Dehnow, Borujen, a village in Borujen County
Deh Now-ye Olya, Kiar, a village in Kiar County
Deh Now-ye Sofla, Kiar, a village in Kiar County
Dehnow-ye Olya, Kuhrang, a village in Kuhrang County
Dehnow-ye Sofla, Kuhrang, a village in Kuhrang County
Deh Now, Falard, a village in Lordegan County
Deh Now, Khanmirza, a village in Lordegan County
Dehnow-e Abbasali, a village in Lordegan County
Dehnow-e Alibaba, a village in Lordegan County
Deh Now-e Allah Morad, a village in Lordegan County
Deh Now-e Bardbor, a village in Lordegan County
Deh Now-ye Barez, a village in Lordegan County
Deh Now-e Gork Allah, a village in Lordegan County
Dehnow-e Gudarz, a village in Lordegan County
Deh Now-e Gudsar, a village in Lordegan County
Deh Now-e Hushang Khan, a village in Lordegan County
Deh Now-e Milas, a village in Lordegan County
Dehnow-e Mohammad Qoli, a village in Lordegan County
Dehnow-e Shams Ali, a village in Lordegan County

Fars Province

Arsanjan County
Deh Now, Arsanjan, a village in Arsanjan County

Eqlid County
Dehnow, Eqlid, a village in Eqlid County

Farashband County
Dehnow, Farashband, a village in Farashband County

Firuzabad County
Deh Now, Firuzabad, a village in Firuzabad County

Kazerun County
Deh Now, Kazerun, a village in Kazerun County
Dehnow-e Bushkan, a village in Kazerun County
Dehnow-e Chamran, a village in Kazerun County
Dehnow-e Enqelab, a village in Kazerun County
Dehnow-e Ghuri, a village in Kazerun County
Dehnow Kashkuli, a village in Kazerun County

Khonj County
Deh Now, Khonj, a village in Khonj County

Lamerd County
Deh Now, Lamerd, a village in Lamerd County
Deh Now, Ala-e Marvdasht, a village in Lamerd County
Deh Now-e Fazeli, a village in Lamerd County

Larestan County

Mamasani County
Deh Now, Mamasani, a village in Mamasani County

Pasargad County
Dehnow, Pasargad, a village in Pasargad County

Rostam County
Dehnow-e Markazi, a village in Rostam County
Dehnow-e Moqimi, a village in Rostam County
Deh Now-e Sadat-e Bala, a village in Rostam County
Deh Now-e Sadat-e Pain, a village in Rostam County
Dehnow-ye Sadat-e Vosta, a village in Rostam County

Sarvestan County
Dehnow, Sarvestan, a village in Sarvestan County

Shiraz County
Deh Now, Shiraz, a village in Shiraz County
Deh Now, Arzhan, a village in Shiraz County
Deh Now, Siyakh Darengun, a village in Shiraz County

Zarrin Dasht County
Deh Now, Zarrin Dasht, a village in Zarrin Dasht County

Hamadan Province
Deh Now, Asadabad, a village in Asadabad County
Deh Now, Bahar, a village in Bahar County
Dehnow-e Aliabad, a village in Malayer County
Dehnow-e Avarzaman, a village in Malayer County
Deh Now-e Abd ol Maleki, a village in Nahavand County
Deh Now-e Olya, Hamadan, a village in Nahavand County
Deh Now-e Sofla, Hamadan, a village in Nahavand County
Shiravand, Hamadan, Nahavand County

Hormozgan Province
Dehnow-e Bala, Hormozgan, a village in Bandar Abbas County
Dehnow-e Pain, Hormozgan, a village in Bandar Abbas County
Deh Now-e Maragh, a village in Bandar Lengeh County
Deh Now-e Mir, a village in Bandar Lengeh County
Deh Now-e Khvajeh, a village in Bastak County
Deh Now-e Qalandaran, a village in Bastak County
Deh Now, Hajjiabad, a village in Hajjiabad County
Dehnow, Minab, a village in Minab County
Dehnow Damitar-e Shomali, a village in Parsian County
Deh Now, Rudan, a village in Rudan County
Dehnow, Rudkhaneh, a village in Rudan County
Deh Now-e Sarab, a village in Rudan County

Isfahan Province
Deh-e Now, Isfahan, a village in Fereydunshahr County

Kerman Province

Anbarabad County
Deh Now-e Allah Verdi, a village in Anbarabad County
Dehnow-e Fath ol Mobin, a village in Anbarabad County
Dehnow-e Shahsavar Khan, a village in Anbarabad County

Arzuiyeh County
Dehnow, Arzuiyeh, a village in Arzuiyeh County

Baft County
Dehnow, Fathabad, a village in Baft County

Bam County
Deh Now, Bam, a village in Bam County
Deh Now-e Yek, Bam, a village in Bam County

Bardsir County
Deh-e Now-e Mashiz, a city in Bardsir County
Deh Now-e Do, Bardsir, a village in Bardsir County

Fahraj County
Dehnow-e Ansari, a village in Fahraj County
Deh Now-e Behzadi, a village in Fahraj County
Dehnow-e Eslamabad, a village in Fahraj County
Dehnow-e Chahdegan, a village in Fahraj County
Deh Now-e Mirza Zadeh Sejadi, a village in Fahraj County
Dehnow-e Salehabad, a village in Fahraj County

Faryab County

Jiroft County
Dehnow-e Amlak, a village in Jiroft County
Dehnow-e Yek, Jiroft, a village in Jiroft County

Kahnuj County
Dehnow-e Mohammad Khan, a village in Kahnuj County
Hojjatabad, Kahnuj, a village in Kahnuj County

Kerman County
Deh Nevoiyeh, Kerman, a village in Kerman County
Deh Now, Rayen, a village in Kerman County
Deh Now-e Salar, a village in Kerman County

Kuhbanan County
Deh-e Now-e Kahan, a village in Kuhbanan County
Deh Now-e Qalandar, a village in Kuhbanan County

Manujan County
Deh Now, Manujan, a village in Manujan County
Deh Now, Aseminun, a village in Manujan County

Narmsashir County
Dehnow-ye Abbasabad, a village in Narmashir County
Deh Now-e Azizabad, a village in Narmashir County
Deh Now-e Derakhti, a village in Narmashir County
Deh Now-e Esahaqabad, a village in Narmashir County
Dehnow-e Mich, a village in Narmashir County
Deh Now-e Sheykh Ali Khan, a village in Narmashir County

Qaleh Ganj County
Dehnow-e Hajj Ali Mohammad, a village in Qaleh Ganj County

Rabor County

Rafsanjan County
Dehnow, Rafsanjan, a village in Rafsanjan County
Deh Now, Azadegan, a village in Rafsanjan County
Deh-e Now, Nuq, a village in Rafsanjan County
Dehnow, Razmavaran, a village in Rafsanjan County
Deh-e Bala, Rafsanjan, a village in Rafsanjan County
Mahmudiyeh, Rafsanjan, a village in Rafsanjan County

Ravar County
Deh-e Now-ye Ali Shahri, a village in Ravar County

Rigan County
Deh Now-e Gonbaki, a village in Rigan County
Dehnow-e Kasurak, a village in Rigan County

Rudbar-e Jonubi County
Dehnow-e Jari, a village in Rudbar-e Jonubi County
Dehnow-e-Kuhestan, a village in Rudbar-e Jonubi County
Deh Now-e Yarahmadi, a village in Rudbar-e Jonubi County

Shahr-e Babak County
Deh Now, Estabraq, a village in Shahr-e Babak County
Deh Now-e Farrokhzad, a village in Shahr-e Babak County
Deh-e Now-e Jameh, a village in Shahr-e Babak County
Deh Now-e Kheyari, a village in Shahr-e Babak County

Sirjan County
Deh Now, Sirjan, a village in Sirjan County
Deh Now-e Qaleh Olya, a village in Sirjan County
Dehnow-e Yek, Sirjan, a village in Sirjan County

Zarand County
Deh-e Now, Zarand, a village in Zarand County
Deh Now, Sarbanan, a village in Zarand County
Dehnow-ye Herzang, a village in Zarand County
Dehnow-e Sang, a village in Zarand County

Kermanshah Province
Deh Now, Harsin, a village in Harsin County
Deh Now, Kangavar, a village in Kangavar County
Dehnow-e Deh Kohneh, a village in Kangavar County
Dehnow, Sonqor, a village in Sonqor County

Khuzestan Province
Deh Now, Behbahan, a village in Behbahan County
Dehnow, Dezful, a village in Dezful County
Deh-e Now, Izeh, a village in Izeh County
Deh-e Now, Dehdez, a village in Izeh County
Deh Now-ye Kizavak, a village in Izeh County

Kohgiluyeh and Boyer-Ahmad Province
Deh Now-e Darbar, a village in Boyer-Ahmad County
Deh Now-ye Gelal, a village in Boyer-Ahmad County
Dehnow-e Jowkar, a village in Boyer-Ahmad County
Deh Now-e Kakan, a village in Boyer-Ahmad County
Dehnow-e Ludab, a village in Boyer-Ahmad County
Dehnow-e Yasuj, a village in Boyer-Ahmad County
Dehnow-e Emamzadeh Mahmud, a village in Charam County
Dehnow-e Sarfaryab, a village in Charam County
Dehnow-e Talkhab, a village in Charam County
Dehnow-e Tall Gap, a village in Charam County
Deh Now-e Ali Karami, a village in Dana County
Deh Now-e Kukhdan, a village in Dana County
Deh Now-e Darghak, a village in Kohgiluyeh County
Dehnow-e Telmargh, a village in Kohgiluyeh County

Lorestan Province

Aligudarz County
Dehnow, Aligudarz, a village in Aligudarz County
Deh-e Now-e Abdolvand, a village in Aligudarz County
Dehnow Aligar, a village in Aligudarz County

Borujerd County
Deh Now, Borujerd, a village in Borujerd County
Deh Now-ye Moqaddasi, a village in Borujerd County

Delfan County
Deh Now, Delfan, a village in Delfan County
Deh Now-e Karam Ali, a village in Delfan County

Dorud County
Deh Now, Dorud, a village in Dorud County

Khorramabad County
Dehnow, Dehpir, a village in Khorramabad County
Deh Now, Kakasharaf, a village in Khorramabad County
Deh Now Pirjed, a village in Khorramabad County
Deh Now-ye Suki-ye Olya, a village in Khorramabad County
Deh-e Now, Qaedrahmat, a village in Khorramabad County
Deh-e Now, Zagheh, a village Khorramabad Count
Now Deh, Lorestan, a village in Khorramabad County

Selseleh County
Deh Now, Selseleh, a village in Selseleh County

Markazi Province
Deh-e Now, Markazi, a village in Khomeyn County, Markazi Province, Iran
Dehnow, Markazi, a village in Khondab County, Markazi Province, Iran

Razavi Khorasan Province
Deh-e Now, Bakharz, a village in Bakharz County
Deh Now, Chenaran, a village in Chenaran County
Deh Now, Davarzan, a village in Davarzan County
Deh Now, Fariman, a village in Fariman County
Deh Now, Gonabad, a village in Gonabad County
Deh Now, Khalilabad, a village in Khalilabad County
Deh Now, Khoshab, a village in Khoshab County
Deh Now-ye Kenar Gusheh, a village in Mashhad County
Dehnow, Nishapur, a village in Nishapur County
Deh Now, Fazl, a village in Nishapur County
Deh Now, Rivand, a village in Nishapur County
Deh Now-e Kherabeh, a village in Nishapur County
Deh Now-e Lakzi, a village in Nishapur County
Deh Now-e Shur, a village in Nishapur County
Deh Now-ye Hashemabad, a village in Nishapur County
Deh Now-ye Khaleseh, a village in Nishapur County
Deh-e Now, Sabzevar, a village in Sabzevar County
Deh Now, Torbat-e Heydarieh, a village in Torbat-e Heydarieh County
Deh Now, Torbat-e Jam, a village in Torbat-e Jam County
Dehnow, Torqabeh and Shandiz, a village in Torqabeh and Shandiz County
Deh Now, Zaveh, a village in Zaveh County

Sistan and Baluchestan Province
Deh Now, Dalgan, a village in Dalgan County
Deh Now-e Ali Khan, a village in Hirmand County

South Khorasan Province
Deh-e Now, Birjand, a village in Birjand County
Deh Now, Boshruyeh, a village in Boshruyeh County
Deh Now, Nehbandan, a village in Nehbandan County
Deh Now, Dastgerdan, a village in Tabas County
Deh Now, Deyhuk, a village in Tabas County
Dehnow-ye Fatemeh Barat, a village in Tabas County
Dehnowvan, a village in Tabas County

Tehran Province
Deh-e Now, Tehran, a village in Rey County

Yazd Province
Deh Now, Bafq, a village in Bafq County
Deh-e Now Dasht, a village in Behabad County
Deh-e Now Molla Esmail, a village in Behabad County
Deh Now, Khatam, a village in Khatam County
Deh Now, Yazd, a village in Yazd County

See also
Deh Now-e Olya (disambiguation)
Deh Now-e Pain (disambiguation)
Deh Now-e Sofla (disambiguation)
Now Deh (disambiguation)